Nooseneck is a village in Kent County, Rhode Island, United States, in the rural town of West Greenwich. Nooseneck is located on Rhode Island Route 3 near Interstate 95. The Nooseneck River passes through the village, where Interstate 95 crosses over it.

References

Villages in Kent County, Rhode Island
West Greenwich, Rhode Island
Providence metropolitan area
Villages in Rhode Island